Ansley Mall is an open-air shopping mall in the Piedmont Heights neighborhood of Atlanta at 1544 Piedmont Avenue at the intersection of Monroe Drive near the Atlanta BeltLine trail.

Ansley opened in 1964, sending Midtown Atlanta's Tenth Street shopping district into decline. The single-level center had  of leasable area and was anchored by a  Woolworth's variety store and  Colonial supermarket. The tenant list of the 3.2-million-dollar complex included twenty-six retailers.

It was a "twin" of what is now officially called the Crossroads Shopping Center, better known by its name in its heyday, Stewart-Lakewood Center, an open-air shopping center on Metropolitan Parkway (formerly Stewart Avenue) at Langford Parkway (formerly Lakewood Freeway) in the Sylvan Hills neighborhood of southern Atlanta. Stewart-Lakewood was built in 1962 by the same company and in the same style as Ansley and was also considered a major regional retail center.

In 1969, a movie theater in the mall was the site of the Lonesome Cowboys police raid, a seminal moment in the history of the LGBT community in Atlanta.

The mall was renovated in 2010, the works carried out by Earthstation.

Anchors include Publix supermarket, an LA Fitness gym,  and a CVS Pharmacy. It is owned by Selig. 

The Ansley Mall area rivals Cheshire Bridge Road and the intersection of 10th and Piedmont as the most popular gathering area for gay men in Atlanta. Across Clear Creek is Ansley Square, a strip mall with more gay bars and gay-friendly spaces.

References

External links
Official Facebook page

Page on "Mall Hall of Fame" (blog)

Page on Sky City: Southern Retail Then and Now (blog)

Shopping malls in the Atlanta metropolitan area
Shopping malls established in 1964
Gay villages in Georgia (U.S. state)
1964 establishments in Georgia (U.S. state)
LGBT African-American culture